The List of railway routes in Saxony-Anhalt provides a list of all railway routes in Saxony-Anhalt, central Germany. This includes Intercity-Express, Intercity, Regional-Express and Regionalbahn services. In the route tables, the major stations are shown in bold text. Where intermediate stations are not given, these are replaced by three dots "...".

Regional services 
The following Regional-Express and Regionalbahn services run through Saxony-Anhalt. They are grouped by operator.

S-Bahn Mitteldeutschland

S-Bahn Mittelelbe

See also 
 List of scheduled railway routes in Germany

References

External links 
 kursbuch.bahn.de Timetables for all railway routes in Germany
 bauarbeiten.bahn.de Timetable changes due to construction works in Saxony-Anhalt (including map of lines)

Saxony-Anhalt
Transport in Saxony-Anhalt
Saxony-Anhalt-related lists
Saxony-Anhalt